The Seattle Weekly is an alternative biweekly distributed newspaper in Seattle, Washington, United States. It was founded by Darrell Oldham and David Brewster as The Weekly. Its first issue was published on March 31, 1976. The newspaper published its final print edition on February 27, 2019 and transitioned to web-only content on March 1, 2019.

Ownership history
The paper is currently owned by Sound Publishing, Inc., the largest community news organization in Washington State, and is distributed each Wednesday.

Former owners of the Seattle Weekly include Sasquatch Publishing/Quickfish Media, Seattle from 1976 to 1997; Stern Publishing, New York from 1997 to 2000; Village Voice Media, New York from 2000 to 2012; and Voice Media Group from September 2012 to January 2013. Village Voice Media executives Scott Tobias, Christine Brennan and Jeff Mars bought Village Voice Media's papers and associated web properties from its founders to form Voice Media Group. Sound Publishing purchased the Seattle Weekly from Voice Media Group in January 2013.

In July 2006, longtime editor-in-chief Knute Berger announced he would be leaving the paper.  The Seattle Times profiled the change in leadership at the company in a Business & Technology section news report titled, "Uncertain Times at Seattle Weekly".

Mark Baumgarten, former City Arts editor-in-chief and author of Love Rock Revolution, was named editor-in-chief of the Seattle Weekly on March 12, 2013, replacing Mike Seely who resigned January of the same year. In January 2018, Seth Sommerfeld was named editor of Seattle Weekly upon Mark Baumgarten's transition to editorial director, King County. In June 2018, Andy Hobbs replaced Baumgarten as editorial director, and in August 2018, was named editor of the Seattle Weekly.

On February 25, 2019, Sound Publishing announced that the paper would transition to web-only content in a move similar to the Seattle Post-Intelligencer a decade earlier. The final print edition was published on February 27, 2019, and the web-only portal was launched two days later.

Columns
 "Mossback", by Knute Berger as editor-in-chief
 "Ask an Uptight Seattlite", advice by David Stoesz
 "Dategirl", by Judy McGuire
 "Seattleland", by Rick Anderson
 Space Witch, astrology by Elissa Ball
 Stash Box, cannabis culture by Meagan Angus
 Beer Hunting, beer by Jacob Uitti
 Constant Reader, literature by Paul Constant
 "Electric Eye" by Brooklyn Benjestorf (2015–2016)

Competition
The Seattle Weeklys principal competitor is The Stranger, an alternative biweekly paper published in Seattle.

References

External links
Seattle Weekly website

Alternative weekly newspapers published in the United States
Newspapers published in Seattle
Publications established in 1976